The Immune is a political science fiction thriller by “Doc” Lucky Meisenheimer. The novel is an apocalyptic, dystopian tale in which all of humanity is threatened with total annihilation by a virulent, biological phenomenon known as an airwar. The hero of the novel is Navy admiral Dr. John Long, who directs a group of heroes with a genetic immunity to the airwar's poisonous stings in an effort to salvage humanity despite a corrupt world government.

The book was launched on May 13, 2011, at the YMCA Aquatic Center of Orlando. Over 800 guests were in attendance, and $20,000 was raised for the YMCA Aquatic Center's Scholarship Fund. Since its launch, 100 percent of book sale profits have been donated to the Aquatic Center. The Immune has been introduced on international e-retailers as well as every eBook format.

Due to its allegorical nature, The Immune has been taught in various advanced literature classes, such as those at Dr. Phillips High School, one of the largest and most competitive high schools in the state of Florida. In response to the academic interest, a teacher's guide to The Immune by Lucky Meisenheimer was slated to be released in 2013. An audiobook version performed by Stefan Rudnicki was released in the same year.

Characters
Admiral Beckwourth
Dr. John Long
Cassandra
Senator Sniveling
Bob
Mad Mike
Big Zee 
Ron Suggs
Glavin
Captain Stewart

Literary Awards
The International Book Awards Winner in the category of Science Fiction, Finalist in the category of Fiction.

National Indie Excellence Awards Winner in the category of Science Fiction, Finalist in the category of Fiction.

Reader’s Favorites Awards Winner in the categories of Science Fiction and Action.

USA Best Books Awards Winner in the category of Science Fiction.

Reviews
Midwest Book Review

Lytherus.com

The Rational Review

Prometheus Newsletter of the Libertarian Futurist Society

Liberty Maven

Reader Views

References

2011 American novels
2011 science fiction novels
American biopunk novels
Allegory
Dystopian novels
Libertarian books